The title Mayor of Birmingham may refer to:

England 
 
 List of mayors of Birmingham, West Midlands, United Kingdom, a ceremonial figurehead elected by the City Council
 The proposed Mayor of Birmingham, United Kingdom, to be popularly elected executive officer
 Mayor of the West Midlands, who covers the Birmingham metropolitan area

United States 

 List of mayors of Birmingham, Alabama, United States